Mordellina semiusta is a species of tumbling flower beetle in the family Mordellidae. It is found in North America.

References

Further reading

 
 
 
 
 

Mordellidae